The Regional District of Kootenay Boundary (RDKB) is one of 28 regional districts in the province of British Columbia, Canada. As of the 2016 Canadian census, the population was 31,447. The area is 8,095.62 km2 (3,125.74 sq mi). The RDKB was incorporated in 1966 and consists of eight incorporated municipalities and five unincorporated electoral areas. The regional district's offices are in the City of Trail, with secondary offices in the City of Grand Forks. Other major population centres include the cities of Rossland and Greenwood, and the villages of Fruitvale, Warfield, and Montrose. The region also encompasses electoral areas A (east of Fruitvale extending just past Champion Lakes and south to Waneta and the Pend d'Oreille River), B/Lower Columbia-Old Glory, C/Christina Lake, D/Rural Grand Forks and E/West Boundary including Rock Creek, Bridesville, Beaverdell and Big White Ski Resort.

Local government services provided by the RDKB to residents in the region include recreation and culture, planning, building inspection, environmental programs, economic development and public safety services for fire and other emergencies.

Demographics 

Note: Totals greater than 100% due to multiple origin responses.

Municipalities

See also
Kootenays
Boundary Country

Notes

References

Community Profile: Kootenay Boundary Regional District, British Columbia; Statistics Canada

External links

 
Kootenay Boundary